Ajou University is a private research university located in Suwon, Gyeonggi Province, South Korea. It was founded in 1973 by Park Changwon, the governments of France, and the Republic of Korea.

Ajou University started as Ajou Engineering Junior College with the aim of exchanging technology and culture through education between France and South Korea. The name Ajou University contains the ideology of becoming the center of Asia in the 21st century, when Asia becomes the center of the world, and represents the Gyeonggi-do region.

Ajou is located on a single campus witfh all details, research-oriented university hospitals, Techno Valley, Samsung Electronics headquarters, CJ Blossom Park, administrative town (Gyeonggi Provincial Office, Gyeonggi Provincial Council, Education Office, Gyeonggi Representative Library), and legal town (Suwon High Court, Suwon High Prosecutor's Office). Gyeonggi-do Province, administrative towns, legal towns and pharmacies have signed MOUs with Ajou.

Its business college is the only one in Korea that was authorized to host a financial engineering department as part of the world-class research-oriented university project of the Korean Ministry of Education and held a recruitment briefing session for the International Financial Organization. Its business college is a member of both the AACSB and EFMD certification bodies. The e-business department signed an education agreement with SAP Korea. Its information and communication technology college of information has signed an agreement with the Republic of Korea Air Force and established a Department of Defense Digital Convergence to train high-ranking Air Force ICT technology officers.

Ajou University Hospital, an affiliated hospital of the medical school and a base hospital in Gyeonggi-do, is opening Ajou University Intermediate Care Hospital, Ajou University Pyeongtaek Hospital, Ajou University Paju Hospital. It received a hospital brand fee from Jiya Yoon Hospital in China and is preparing to enter China. Ajou is striving for research development and has targeted the world's top 100 universities in the long run. As a university in Asia, which is a latecomer, it is working hard to commercialize technology and aims to achieve 20 billion won per year in profits by 2028. It will also operate self-driving electric vehicles on campus until 2024. In 2020, Ajou established its branch campus in Tashkent, Uzbekistan in which concentrates on its strong engineering programs.

The Department of Space Electronics Information Engineering is studying satellite information and communication technology.

Notable academic programs 

 Exchange student: As of 2021 years, it was held with 325 schools in 67 countries. It is a program that exchanges students with foreign universities and institutions where academic exchange agreements are signed. By paying tuition to the main school and studying at an overseas university for a semester, credits taken from overseas universities are recognized as the main school. Ajou is a member of ISEP (International Student Exchange Program), CREPUQ (Conference of Rectors and Principals of Quebec Universities), HUMAP (Hyogo University Mobility in Asia and the Pacific), "n+i" Network(French Union of Technology Universities), AUF(Federation of French Universities).
 Multiple degrees: A program that takes 1/2 of its graduation credits and takes the remaining credits from other schools, earning both Ajou University and other schools' degrees. It is currently operated by the Illinois Institute of Technology and Stony Brook University in the United States.
 Blue Ladder: The business of the Ministry of Education of Korea. Despite the difficult environment, it supports overseas training experiences to college students who have dreams and passion for self-development and career development. Each university in charge selects students and proceeds with the program. Ajou University was selected in 2018 and runs for three years. The schools include the University of Michigan and the University of Washington in the United States, and Shanghai Transportation University in China.
 Global Internship: A program that sends students to companies in about 20 countries around the world for internships to provide more diverse and challenging overseas experience opportunities. It will provide opportunities to learn the senses and explore career in overseas industrial sites related to majors. It will be dispatched to INKE (World Korean Venture Network), IDB (US Development Bank), KOTRA (Korea Trade and Investment Promotion Corporation), CKP (USA Asia Accounting Corporation), W-OKTA (World Korean Trade Association), HMART, etc. It is recognized as a credit for the third and fourth grade internship courses.
 Short-term dispatch: It is a program that is sent to sister universities abroad for about four weeks during the vacation. Participation in language training, international training programs, etc. at sister universities may be recognized as credits. Part of the program participation fee may be supported by scholarships.
 Global Leaders Belt in Business Administration
Global Leadership in Business Administration
ABIZ Global Supporters in Business Administration

Reputation and rankings 

2023 QS : World 488th
2022 QS : World 531~540th.
2021 QS 50 Under 50 : World 101-150th.
2019 JoongAng Ilbo University Evaluation(Korean Press): Nation 11th.
2019 Employment and Start-up Evaluation of Hankyung(Korean Press) : Nation 5th.
2021 WURI Global Top 100 Innovative Universities : World 62th.
2019 REUTERS Asia Pacific's Most Innovative Universities : Asia 24th.
2021 THE Impact Rankings : 201-300th.

Education programs

Symbol 

The Statue of Pioneer is the symbol of Ajou University. It is located at the school's main entrance.

Central Library 
In order to contribute to the learning, cultivation and research of students and faculty members through the collection, accumulation and distribution of information, the Central Library was established on March 15, 1973. It was opened together with the opening of the prefecture elementary and junior college. At the time of opening, there were 120 seats of the first floor of the main building. From April 12, 1973, 1,272 books were purchased with one librarian. In 1983, Daewoo Group Kim Dae-woo, chairman of the Daewoo Group, donated 5 billion won to renovate the Central Library. The new total floor space was 4,026 pyeong. On October 16, 2017, the entire library on the second floor was converted into a community lounge through remodeling. In addition, on the first floor, the space that was previously used for the corridor was expanded to build a café, allowing rest space and convenience facilities.

Dining halls 

The campus is mainly served by two large cafeterias and many minor restaurants. The biggest restaurant is close to the dormitories and is called the Dormitory Restaurant. It has two floors and serves both Korean and Western style foods with a daily rotating menu. The second biggest restaurant is called the Student Restaurant, and is located in the Student Union building. There are also smaller restaurants in Paldal hall, Dasan hall and Jonghap Hall.

Dormitories 

There are five big dormitories on campus: Nam-jae dormitory, Yong-Ji dormitory, Hwa-hong dormitory, Kwang-Gyu dormitory and the newly built International dormitory. Nam-jae and Yong-ji dormitories are exclusively boys' dormitories while Kwang-gyu is a girls' dormitory.  Hwa-hong houses both males and females (on separate floors; girls' floors are female-keycard access only) and is one of two dormitories open to foreigners as exchange students or regular students. The other one open for foreigners is the newly built International dormitory. Except for Hwa-hong and International dormitory, all the dormitories have rooms with four occupants each. International and Hwa-hong have two-bed and four-bed rooms. They also have single rooms for visiting professors.
Ajou University International Dormitory VIDEO

Notable alumni 
Ahn Jung-Hwan, football player
Ha Seok-Ju, football player
Jee Seok-jin, entertainer
Kim Ji-hoon, actor
Lee Min-Sung, football player
Woo Sung-Yong, football player
Eon Tae Ha, CEO of Hyundai Motor Company
Lee Guk-jong, Head of the trauma lab at the University Institute for Advanced Medicine, trauma specialist.
Chi Hwan Lee,  biomedical engineer, academic, and researcher

Four seasons at Ajou

See also 
 Education in South Korea

References 

1973 establishments in South Korea
Educational institutions established in 1973
Private universities and colleges in South Korea
Ajou University
U-League